The following is a list of marathon races in North America.

Legend

Race list

See also

IAAF Road Race Label Events
World Marathon Majors

References

 
M
Marathon races, North America
Marathon races